UN observer might refer to

 United Nations General Assembly observers, entities with limited participation in the UN General Assembly
 United Nations Military Observer, troops of the UN Security Council